Shahmeran Hamam is a historical hamam (Turkish bath) in Tarsus, Turkey, associated with the legendary story of Shahmaran.

Bath house
The hamam or Turkish bath house is in the urban fabric (Kızılmurat neighborhood), within the Tarsus district of the Mersin Province in Turkey.

The bath house was built on the foundations of an older Roman bath by the Ramazanids, a beylik, which was sovereign between the 14th and 16th centuries. During the  Ottoman Empire era in 1873, it was restored. The rectangular plan hamam has four iwans, the building material is rubble stone and main parts of the hamam are covered by a dome. In addition to common hamam, there are ten wooden private rooms with bath.

Legend of Shahmaran

Shahmaran is a mythical creature, half woman and half snake and the monarch of the snakes. There are several versions of the tale, since it is an older story. It involves the relationship between the Shahmaran creature and a young man, and the man later betrays their trust. Towards the end of the tale, the Shahmaran leaves their cave and is killed by the townspeople in a bathhouse that bares the same name as this one.

On the wall of the hamam, there are some red spots, which are the sources of the legend. However, there are many variations of the story and some believe this happened in a different location.

References

Buildings and structures in Mersin Province
Turkish legends
Tarsus, Mersin
Public baths in Turkey